The Madagascar fish eagle (Haliaeetus vociferoides) or Madagascar sea-eagle (to distinguish it from the Ichthyophaga fishing-eagles), is a large bird of prey in the family Accipitridae which also includes many other diurnal raptors such as kites, buzzards and harriers. It is endemic to the coastal strip in the northwest of Madagascar. The Madagascan fish eagle has been suffering from a declining population and is threatened by habitat destruction and persecution, and the International Union for Conservation of Nature has rated its conservation status as being "critically endangered".

Description
The body and wings are dark brown, with a pale brown head and a white tail; the bill is blackish with a paler base, and the legs are pale grey. Males weigh , while the slightly larger females weigh .

Its closest relative is the African fish eagle, Haliaeetus vocifer. Together, they form a distinct species pair lineage of sea-eagles, which separated soon after the divergence of the genus; they retain the ancestral dark beak, talon, and eye, but unlike other Haliaeetus species, they always have at least partially white tails, even while juvenile. As in other sea-eagle species pairs, one species (the Madagascan fish eagle in this case) has a tan head, while the other has a white one.

Distribution 
This species is endemic to Madagascar, where it survives in low numbers along the northwest coast north of Morondava. The range of this eagle is within the Madagascar dry deciduous forests. The principal locus of population according to the United Nations Environmental Programme is in the Analova region; 20 to 25 breeding pairs were there as of the 1980s. A more recent survey by Garbutt and Hogan report a smaller concentration of at least three breeding pairs in the Anjajavy Forest along the Indian Ocean, where several streams discharge north of Anjajavy Village.

Status 
Total population estimates from the United Nations and from Grambo  place the world population of this species at about 40 breeding pairs; according to Grambo this bird may be one of the rarest birds on Earth. Other surveys between 1991 and 1995 recorded at least 222 adults from 105 sites, with an estimated 98 breeding pairs.

The main threats to its breeding habitat are deforestation, soil erosion and the development of wetland areas for rice paddies. It is also in direct competition with humans for fish stocks. Because of its decline in numbers and the threats it faces, the International Union for Conservation of Nature has assessed the bird's conservation status as being "critically endangered".

Gallery

Footnotes 

 References

 
 

 Cited works

 

Madagascar fish eagle
Endemic birds of Madagascar
Birds of prey of Madagascar
Critically endangered fauna of Africa
Madagascar fish eagle